Underlöjtnant (from the German word Unterleutnant) was the lowest officer rank in the Swedish Army from 1835 to 1937 instead of the previous ranks of fänrik and cornet.  was reintroduced in 1914 with the same position as , from 1926 with lower position.

History
 was introduced as a military rank in Sweden in 1835 instead of fänrik. The  would have s position and salary benefits but be appointed by Warrant of Appointment. The Minister of Defence proposed (Bill 1924:20) that certain  should receive a rank above the rank of - with the position of löjtnant. They would be called  ("second lieutenants").  would receive the rank of  while retaining the title.

General Order No. 1806/1925 regulated for the army the position of non-commissioned officers in accordance with guidelines issued by the Minister of Defence (Bill 1925:50).

The term  was formally abolished in 1937.

Uniform

Uniform model 1923

Uniform model 1910

Footnotes

References

Notes

Print

Military ranks of the Swedish Army

sv:Underlöjtnant